The Dundee Stock Exchange was established in 1879. In 1964, it merged into the Scottish Stock Exchange along with the Glasgow Stock Exchange, Edinburgh Stock Exchange, and Aberdeen Stock Exchange. It continued to operate as a local branch until 1971, when the local exchanges closed completely. By 1973, the Scottish Stock Exchange had merged into the London Stock Exchange.

The archives of the Dundee Stock Exchange are held by Archive Services at the University of Dundee.

References 

1879 establishments in Scotland
1964 disestablishments in Scotland
Economy of Dundee
Organisations based in Dundee
Organizations established in 1879
Economic history of Scotland
Former stock exchanges in the United Kingdom